A land yacht is an informal category of large automobiles. While full-size cars are manufactured worldwide to this day, the term is most often used in reference to full-size cars of American origin between 1960 and 1976.

Alongside full-size and luxury four-door sedans, the land yacht term was applicable to multiple body styles, including two-door notchback sedans, personal luxury coupés, convertibles, and station wagons.

Land yachts are among the largest mass-produced cars manufactured, a category which is represented by full-size SUVs.

American cars 
The term "land yacht" began to appear in the late 1950s, as full-size luxury cars began to grow in size independently from mainstream nameplates. Initially descriptive of the high level of comfort features and soft ride, land yachts were designed "for the open road where living room-comfortable seats made the front seat seem like a plush couch with a windshield and steering wheel in front of it." During the 1960s and 1970s, land yachts of various types were produced by nearly all American automobile manufacturers; the largest were offered by Cadillac, Lincoln, Imperial and Buick. Many examples of the 1970s were denoted by a "Brougham" trim level. Following the 1973 and 1979 oil crises, the "land yacht" term had negative connotations, primarily referencing the cars' poor handling (as a consequence of the soft ride), unwieldy size, and vague steering.

The 1973 oil crisis brought the first wave of American-produced cars to face pressure toward downsizing, coinciding with a shift by consumers away from glamour alone towards quality, feature content, and fuel economy. For example, American Motors' last full-size car was a redesigned 1974 Ambassador on a  wheelbase offered only in Brougham trim that was discontinued after one model year as consumers shifted toward more economical cars. 

Following the 1979 oil crisis, US car manufacturers again "struggled to redirect the inertia of bigger cars and engines." The New Yorker, the flagship of the Chrysler brand with a  wheelbase and a  V8 engine, was discontinued after 1978 before being succeeded by a smaller model. In 1991 and 1992, respectively, General Motors and Ford would introduce redesigned full-size cars for the last time. After the 1996 model year, General Motors phased out production of the Buick Roadmaster, Chevrolet Caprice, and Cadillac Fleetwood, with the Ford Crown Victoria, Mercury Grand Marquis, and Lincoln Town Car outlasting them by 15 years.

Excluding limousines, the longest American-produced production sedan is the 1974-76 Cadillac Fleetwood 75 nine-passenger sedan measured . At , the heaviest American-produced car (excluding trucks and SUVs) is the 1960 Lincoln Continental convertible. 

As of 2022, these remain the longest and heaviest production cars made by American-market manufacturers.

European cars 
Outside of North America, the term "land yacht" sees little use on locally produced cars, largely due to different consumer demands. Past and present, several flagship models from Rolls-Royce, Mercedes-Benz, and Bentley have placed ride comfort as a primary design objective, with dimensions comparable to the largest American saloons produced.

In contrast to its LWB counterpart, the Mercedes-Benz 600 SWB was developed to be driven by its owner; it was produced nearly exclusively as a four-door saloon.

The Rolls-Royce Phantom VII (and the currently produced Phantom VIII successor) are positioned as flagship saloons, breaking from the previous Phantom model line of limousines bodied by coachbuilders. Following the 2002–2012 Maybach 57 and 62, Mercedes-Benz revived the nameplate as its Mercedes-Maybach sub-brand in 2015.
Aston Martin has also produced large-sized models including the 1974-1990 Lagonda and the Lagonda Taraf.

Recreational vehicles and trailers 

The "land yacht" description was used in the 1941 film Sullivan's Travels to describe a bus converted with bedrooms, bathroom, and kitchen, or an early recreational vehicle (RV).

Airstream, an American manufacturer of RV trailers (caravans), used Land Yacht as the model name of its flagship model line of trailers.

See also
Full-size car
List of largest passenger vehicles in the United States

References

Automotive terminology
Recreational vehicles